Sujangphaa was the king of the Ahom kingdom from 1407 CE to 1422 CE. He was the eldest of King Sudangphaa's three sons. After the death of his father at an early age, Sujangphaa ascended the throne in 1407 CE. Nothing of any importance was recorded in the chronicles of Ahom during his fifteen year long reign. He died in 1422 CE and was succeeded by his son, Suphakphaa.

See also

 Ahom Dynasty
 Assam
 Sibsagar district
 Singarigharutha ceremony
 Sukaphaa

Notes

References

 
 

Ahom kings
Ahom kingdom

1420s deaths
Year of birth unknown
Year of death uncertain